Chalon Cathedral is a Roman Catholic church located in Chalon-sur-Saône. A former cathedral, it was the seat of the Bishop of Chalon. The diocese was abolished by the Concordat of 1801 and its territory absorbed by the Diocese of Autun.

Parts of the building date from the 8th century, but the Neo-Gothic façade is from the 19th. It was declared a national monument of France in 1903.

Sources
 Catholic Hierarchy
 Structurae

References

See also
 List of Gothic Cathedrals in Europe

Former cathedrals in France
Churches in Saône-et-Loire
Monuments historiques of Bourgogne-Franche-Comté